The 1986 Lafayette Leopards football team was an American football team that represented Lafayette College during the 1986 NCAA Division I-AA football season. In the first year of play for the Colonial League, Lafayette tied for second place. 

In their sixth year under head coach Bill Russo, the Leopards compiled a 6–5 record. Charles Brantley, Ryan Priest and Chris Thatcher were the team captains.

Lafayette's 2–2 conference record tied for second in the five-team Colonial League standings. Against all opponents, the Leopards were outscored 318 to 306.

Lafayette played its home games at Fisher Field on College Hill in Easton, Pennsylvania.

Schedule

References

Lafayette
Lafayette Leopards football seasons
Lafayette Leopards football